Shubhangi Joshi (4 June 1946 – 5 September 2018) was an Indian theatre and television actress.

Career
Joshi started her acting career on Marathi stage. She received wider recognition with roles in television serials.

Television
Joshi also had a fairly successful career as a television actor in both Hindi and Marathi languages. She played roles in many television series.

Television series
 Abhalmaya
 Kahe Diya Pardes
 Kunku, Tikli Ani 
Tumcha Aamcha Same Asta
 Vadalvaat

Personal life
Shubhangi Joshi is survived by her husband Manohar Joshi, son Sameera and daughter-in-law Sarita Joshi, daughter Medha Sane and her grandchildren.

Death
Shubhangi Joshi died on 5 September 2018 in Mumbai due to age and health issues.

References

External links
 

1946 births
2018 deaths
20th-century Indian actresses
21st-century Indian actresses
Indian film actresses
Indian television actresses
Actresses in Marathi cinema
Actresses from Mumbai
Actresses in Hindi television
Deaths from cerebrovascular disease